Gaultheria fragrantissima is a species of flowering plant native to southern and southeastern Asia. It is commonly known as dhasingre.

Description
Gaultheria fragrantissima is a shrub or small tree. The flowering period of the plant extends from April to May.

Distribution and habitat
Gaultheria fragrantissima ranges from India and Sri Lanka through Nepal, Tibet, and the Himlalayas to south-central China, and to Vietnam, Myanmar, Peninsular Malaysia, Sumatra, Java, and Bali.

Gaultheria fragrantissima is native to montane tropical and subtropical forests from 1,375 to 2,650 metres elevation.

Subspecies
Three subspecies are recognized:
 Gaultheria fragrantissima subsp. fragrantissima – India and Sri Lanka to south-central China, Myanmar, and Peninsular Malaysia. Synonyms include Gaultheria forrestii Diels, Gaultheria fragrans D.Don, Gaultheria hirsuta Gardner ex C.B.Clarke, Gaultheria leschenaultii DC., Gaultheria ovalifolia Wall., and Gaultheria rudis Stapf.
 Gaultheria fragrantissima var. obovata S.Panda & Sanjappa – south Western Ghats of Tamil Nadu in southern India.
 Gaultheria fragrantissima subsp. punctata (Blume) Steenis – Sumatra, Java, and Bali. Gaultheria punctata Blume is a synonym.

Uses
G. fragrantissima subsp. fragrantissima is used as a medicinal plant in Ayurveda. The plant is known as "Wel kapuru - වල් කපුරු" or "Wel kapuru - වෙල් කපුරු" by Sinhalese people.

References

External links 
jstor.org
Pollen morphology or some selected plants from Horton Plains

fragrantissima
Indomalayan realm flora
Plants used in Ayurveda
Plants described in 1820